Anna Hřebřinová (November 11, 1908 – December 6, 1993) was a Czechoslovak gymnast who competed for Czechoslovakia in the 1936 Summer Olympics in Berlin, Germany.

In 1936 she won the silver medal as member of the Czechoslovak gymnastics team.

References

External links
 
 

1908 births
1993 deaths
Czechoslovak female artistic gymnasts
Olympic gymnasts of Czechoslovakia
Gymnasts at the 1936 Summer Olympics
Olympic silver medalists for Czechoslovakia
Olympic medalists in gymnastics
Medalists at the 1936 Summer Olympics
Gymnasts from Prague